Hays is a city in and the county seat of Ellis County, Kansas, United States. The largest city in northwestern Kansas, it is the economic and cultural center of the region.  As of the 2020 census, the population of the city was 21,116.  It is also a college town, home to Fort Hays State University.

History 

Prior to American settlement of the area, the site of Hays was located near where the territories of the Arapaho, Kiowa, and Pawnee met. Claimed first by France as part of Louisiana and later acquired by the United States with the Louisiana Purchase in 1803, it lay within the area organized by the U.S. as Kansas Territory in 1854. Kansas became a state in 1861, and the state government delineated the surrounding area as Ellis County in 1867.

In 1865, the U.S. Army established Fort Fletcher southeast of present-day Hays to protect stagecoaches traveling the Smoky Hill Trail. A year later, the Army renamed the post Fort Hays in honor of the late Brig. Gen. Alexander Hays. In late 1866, anticipating the construction of the Kansas Pacific Railway as far west as Fort Hays, a party from St. Louis, Missouri led by William Webb selected three sections of land for colonization near the fort. In June 1867, to better serve the railroad, the Army relocated Fort Hays 15 miles northwest to a site near where the railroad was to cross Big Creek, a tributary of the Smoky Hill River. Seeing a business opportunity, Buffalo Bill Cody and railroad contractor William Rose founded the settlement of Rome near the fort's new location. Within a month, the population of Rome grew to over 2,000. Webb, meanwhile, established the Big Creek Land Company and then surveyed and platted a town site, which he named Hays City after the fort, roughly one mile east of Rome. The railroad reached Hays City soon thereafter and constructed a depot there. The railroad's arrival, combined with a cholera epidemic that hit Rome in the late summer of 1867, drove Rome businesses and residents to relocate to Hays City. Within a year, Rome was completely abandoned. As the western terminus of the railway, Hays City grew rapidly, serving as the supply point for territories to the west and southwest.

As a frontier town, Hays City experienced the kind of violence that gave rise to the myth of the American Old West. Several notable figures of the Old West lived in the Hays City of this era, including George Armstrong Custer, his wife Elizabeth Bacon Custer, Calamity Jane, Buffalo Bill Cody, and Wild Bill Hickok who served a brief term as sheriff in 1869. 30 homicides occurred between 1867 and 1873 including a deadly saloon shootout involving Fort Hays soldiers. A cemetery north of town became known as “Boot Hill”; by 1885, it held the bodies of some 79 outlaws.

Hays experienced significant racial violence during the same period. In 1869, the murder of Union Pacific watchman James Hayes led to the lynching of three African American soldiers.  That same year, six black soldiers at Fort Hays were murdered, their bodies were dropped in a well that was sodded over, and they were falsely reported as deserters.  A mob then hunted down and lynched two black barbers, and the town's black residents were expelled. This and numerous other racial incidents throughout the last half of the 19th century gave Hays a reputation as a sundown town. African Americans living in nearby Nicodemus were not welcome after dark.  No signs formally establishing this policy were posted, but the town's reputation for racial discrimination persisted for decades.

Hays City became the county seat of Ellis County in 1870, and the town became more civilized.  Rougher elements of the populace had begun to leave in the late 1860s, many following the Kansas Pacific railroad construction west to Sheridan or moving south to Dodge City. Volga Germans started settling in Ellis County in 1876, finding its land suitable for their lifestyle and the types of crops they had grown in Russia. They brought with them Turkey Red Wheat, a type of winter wheat whose cultivation contributed to the agricultural transformation of the region. Bukovina Germans began settling in the area in 1886. These groups had a significant impact on the local way of life, establishing Hays as a regional center of ethnic German culture.  Hays City was incorporated in 1885, and, in 1895, it was renamed as simply Hays.

Fort Hays closed in 1889. In 1900, the Kansas delegation to the U.S. Congress secured the fort's land and facilities for educational purposes. The following year, the Kansas Legislature established the Fort Hays Experiment Station, part of Kansas State Agricultural College, on the Fort Hays reservation and set aside land for the Western Branch of Kansas State Normal School, which opened in 1902 and eventually became Fort Hays State University. Fort Hays opened as a historical park in 1929 and was later acquired by the Kansas Historical Society. In 1967, it became the Fort Hays State Historic Site.

Several disasters have struck Hays over the course of its history. In 1895, fire destroyed 60 buildings downtown. Severe floods occurred in 1907 and 1951. In 1919, three Standard Oil gasoline tanks exploded, killing eight and injuring approximately 150 people. In 1935, the city experienced violent dust storms as part of the Dust Bowl.

Hays began to modernize in the early 1900s with a power plant, waterworks, telephone exchange, and sewer system complete by 1911. Over the following decades, the city evolved into a regional economic hub. Development of oil fields in the surrounding area began in 1936 with Hays serving as a trading center and shipping point. Hays Regional Airport opened in 1961. Interstate 70 reached Hays in 1966. Today, Hays is a commercial and educational center for western Kansas.
Hays was the subject of an April, 1952 cultural article in National Geographic Magazine

Geography 

Big Creek, a tributary of the Smoky Hill River, runs through the southwestern part of the city. Chetolah Creek, a tributary of Big Creek, flows south through the eastern part of the city.

Climate
Hays sits near the convergence of a humid continental climate (Köppen Dwa) and a temperate semi-arid climate (Köppen BSk). It typically experiences hot summers with variable humidity and cold winters. Due to its geographic location at a climatic boundary, severe weather is common, with tornadoes a major threat, especially in the spring and early summer months. On average, January is the coldest month, and July is both the hottest and wettest month.

The average temperature in Hays is 54 °F (12 °C). The high temperature reaches or exceeds  an average of 63 days a year and reaches or exceeds  an average of 14 days a year. The minimum temperature falls below the freezing point  an average of 136 days a year.

On average, Hays receives  of precipitation in a year with the largest share being received from May through August. The average relative humidity is 64%. There are, on average, 77 days of measurable precipitation each year. Annual snowfall averages . Measurable snowfall occurs an average of 11 days a year with at least an inch of snow being received on six of those days. Snow depth of at least an inch occurs an average of 25 days a year. Typically, the first fall freeze occurs by the second week of October, and the last spring freeze occurs by the last week of April.

Demographics

2010 census
As of the 2010 United States Census, there were 20,510 people, 8,698 households, and 4,639 families residing in the city. The racial makeup of the city was 92.8% Caucasian American, 1.1% African American, 0.3% American Indian, 1.8% Asian, 2.1% from other races, and 1.8% from two or more races. Hispanics and Latinos of any race were 4.7% of the population.

There were 8,698 households, of which 23.3% had children under the age of 18 living with them, 41.7% were married couples living together, 8.2% had a female householder with no husband present, 3.4% had a male householder with no wife present, and 46.7% were non-families. 33.2% of all households were made up of individuals, and 10% had someone living alone who was 65 years of age or older. The average household size was 2.25, and the average family size was 2.89.

The median age in the city was 29.1 years. 19.7% of residents were under the age of 18; 22.7% were between the ages of 18 and 24; 23.6% were from 25 to 44; 21.4% were from 45 to 64; and 12.7% were 65 years of age or older. The gender makeup of the city was 49.3% male and 50.7% female.

The median income for a household was $44,227, and the median income for a family was $62,775. Males had a median income of $35,905 versus $31,379 for females. The per capita income for the city was $24,536. About 5.7% of families and 15.6% of the population were below the poverty line, including 5.9% of those under age 18 and 7.8% of those age 65 or over.

Economy
The service sector constitutes most of the local economy with education and health care being two major industries. Hays also hosts some manufacturing. EnerSys, a producer of sealed lead batteries, operates a plant in the city as do Adronics, an auto parts maker, and Rans Designs, a manufacturer of aircraft and bicycles. Other local companies manufacture oil field supplies, HVAC systems, and wheelchairs.

As of 2012, 76.8% of the population over the age of 16 was in the labor force. 0.1% was in the armed forces, and 76.7% was in the civilian labor force with 73.1% being employed and 3.6% unemployed. The composition, by occupation, of the employed civilian labor force was:  31.2% in sales and office occupations; 30.0% in management, business, science, and arts; 20.0% in service occupations; 9.8% in natural resources, construction, and maintenance; 9.0% in production, transportation, and material moving. The three industries employing the largest percentages of the working civilian labor force were:  educational services, health care, and social assistance (30.7%); retail trade (16.2%); and arts, entertainment, recreation, and accommodation and food services (10.5%). Hays Medical Center, Fort Hays State University, and Hays Public Schools are the city's three largest employers. Other major employers include local government, Nex-Tech, Eagle Communications, AT&T Inc., and other telecommunications firms, retail stores, and social services providers.

The cost of living in Hays is relatively low; compared to a U.S. average of 100, the cost of living index for the city is 81.7. As of 2012, the median home value in the city was $147,300, the median selected monthly owner cost was $1,254 for housing units with a mortgage and $445 for those without, and the median gross rent was $584.

Government

Hays is a city of the second class with a commission-manager form of government, which it adopted in 1919. The city commission consists of five commissioners elected at-large every two years. The commission meets on the second and fourth Thursday of each month. One commissioner serves as mayor, presiding over commission meetings and representing the city at ceremonial events. The city manager is hired by the commission and is responsible for advising the commission, enforcing its policies, administering city employees, and preparing a proposed city budget.

As the county seat, Hays is the administrative center of Ellis County. The county courthouse is located downtown, and all departments of the county government base their operations in the city.

Hays lies within Kansas's 1st U.S. Congressional District. For the purposes of representation in the Kansas Legislature, the city is located in the 40th district of the Kansas Senate and the 111th district of the Kansas House of Representatives.

Education

Primary and secondary education
The community is served by Hays USD 489 public school district, which operates eight schools in Hays:

 Lincoln Elementary School (Grades Pre-K)
 O'Loughlin Elementary School (Pre-K-5)
 Roosevelt Elementary School (Pre-K-5)
 Woodrow Wilson Elementary School (Pre-K-5)

 Hays Middle School (6-8)
 Hays High School (9-12)
 Westside School, alternative school
 The Learning Center, alternative school

The Roman Catholic Diocese of Salina oversees two Catholic schools in Hays:  Holy Family Elementary School (Pre-K-6) and Thomas More Prep-Marian (7-12). There are also two other Christian schools in the city:  Hays Seventh-Day Adventist School (K-8) and High Plains Christian School (Pre-K-8).

Colleges and universities

Fort Hays State University (FHSU) is located in Hays.  A four-year public university with more than 11,000 students, it is the third largest university in Kansas. North Central Kansas Technical College, a two-year public college  based in Beloit, Kansas, also has a campus in Hays. Immediately south of the city, Kansas State University operates its Agricultural Research Center—Hays, formerly the Fort Hays Experiment Station. The Center studies regional crop management and livestock production, and, for that purpose, its  campus includes a feedlot, a greenhouse complex, cropland, and rangeland as well as a preserved natural area.

Hays was home to the now closed Bissing's Conservatory of Music established by Petrowitsch Bissing in 1901.  Records show that it was still in operation as of 1918.

Libraries
Hays Public Library, located downtown, is the city's main library. Its collection consists of more than 145,000 volumes, and it circulates more than 1.1 million items annually. The Library first opened in 1900, expanding into a Carnegie library in 1911, which remained open until its replacement by a larger facility in 1968. That facility, in turn, has since been renovated and expanded further, re-opening in 2004. A remodel began in 2020 and will be completed in 2021. The library offers several services to the public, including computer classes, ESL and literacy tutoring, and programs for adults, teens, and children. The Hays Public Library is home to the Dorothy D. Richards Kansas Room, a local history and reference collection consisting of books and resources pertaining to the history of Kansas and the American West. The room is named after Dorothy Richards, the library's former director and first Kansas Room Librarian. She started the collection by setting aside Kansas related materials behind her desk. Today, The Kansas Room offers programs related to history, natural history, and genealogy. FHSU's Forsyth Library holds more than 225,000 volumes and serves as a federal depository library. In addition to government documents, its special collections include an archive of children's literature and materials relating to regional history and culture.

Infrastructure

Transportation
Interstate 70 and U.S. Route 40 run concurrently southeast-northwest immediately north of Hays. U.S. Route 183 runs north–south through Hays, intersecting I-70 immediately north of the city. A U.S. 183 bypass route runs around Hays to the west from U.S. 183 immediately south of the city to I-70 northwest of the city.

Greyhound Lines offers long-distance bus service with a stop in Hays.

Hays Regional Airport is located just southeast of the city.  Used primarily for general aviation, it hosts one commercial airline United Express, which offers daily jet service to Denver, Colorado.

Union Pacific Railroad provides freight rail transport via its Kansas Pacific (KP) line, which runs southeast–northwest through downtown Hays in the southern part of the city.

Utilities
Water production and distribution, waste water collection and treatment, and sewer maintenance are the responsibility of the city government's Utilities Department. The government's Public Works Department and several local businesses provide trash removal. Midwest Energy, Inc., a regional energy company headquartered in the city, provides both electric power and natural gas service.

Health care
Hays Medical Center is the sole hospital in the city. A private, non-profit hospital established in 1991, it is a 165-bed general medical and surgical facility that serves as a regional referral center for northwestern Kansas.

Media 

The Hays Daily News is the city's primary newspaper, published six days a week. In addition, Fort Hays State University publishes a weekly student newspaper, The University Leader.

Hays is a center of broadcast media for central and northwestern Kansas. One AM radio station, 12 FM radio stations, and three television stations are licensed to and/or broadcast from the city. Hays is in the Wichita-Hutchinson television market, and two television stations broadcast from the city, one CBS network affiliate and one ABC translator station, both of which are satellite stations of their respective affiliates in Wichita. The third station is the flagship station of Smoky Hills Public Television, the PBS member network covering western Kansas. Licensed to Hays, it broadcasts from studios in Bunker Hill, Kansas.

Parks and recreation
The city government's Parks Department maintains 16 parks in the city. The largest is Frontier Park, located immediately south of downtown across the U.S. 183 bypass route from the Fort Hays State Historic Site. Divided into eastern, western, and northern sections, it includes an 18-hole disc golf course and pens that are home to a herd of American bison kept at the park since 1953. The department also maintains three baseball parks, a soccer complex, tennis courts, a roller hockey and skateboard park, and a second, 9-hole disc golf course. In addition, the Hays Recreation Commission manages a municipal swimming pool and a waterpark, Hays Aquatic Park.

There are two golf courses in the city, Fort Hays Municipal Golf Course and Smoky Hill Country Club. The municipal course is an 18-hole course located immediately southwest of the city, built around the Fort Hays historical site. Smoky Hill Country Club is a private, 18-hole course that opened in the western part of the city in 1962.

Culture

Arts and music
An established arts community supports several galleries in the city. The Hays Arts Council operates the Hays Arts Center Gallery, which displays the work of Kansas artists and sponsors exhibitions and competitions throughout the year. FHSU's Moss-Thorns Gallery of Art, affiliated with the university's Art Department, displays student and faculty works as well as traveling exhibits.  In addition, a number of local artists manage their own galleries around the city.

The Hays Symphony Orchestra, established in 1914, is an ensemble of university, regional, and community musicians that performs in FHSU's Beach/Schmidt Performing Arts Center. The center also hosts the university's Encore Series, a performing arts series that consists of dramatic and musical performances throughout the year.

Events
Hays is a regional center of German American culture due to the number of German immigrants who settled the area in the 1870s and 1880s. As of 2010, 56.5% of the city population claimed German ancestry. The city hosts several events throughout the year that celebrate this heritage including two Oktoberfests. The Midwest Deutsche Oktoberfest takes place the third week of September. Fort Hays State University and The Volga German Society hold an Oktoberfest celebration on the first or second Friday in October. In addition, Polka Fest occurs in March, and the Ellis County Historical Museum hosts German Heritage Days in April.

To celebrate Independence Day and to mark its early history as an Old West frontier town, the city hosts the annual Wild West Festival during the first week of July. The festival includes country and rock music concerts, a carnival, a parade, a fishing tournament, baseball games, and a fireworks display. On the first weekend in December, the Kansas Historical Society holds Christmas Past at Historic Fort Hays, showcasing history programs and tours of the fort with it decorated for Christmas as it was in the late 1800s.

Points of interest

There are several museums and sites in Hays dedicated to aspects of area history. FHSU's Sternberg Museum of Natural History features extensive collections and exhibits of fossil specimens, including an interactive diorama of life in the region during the Cretaceous period. Affiliated with the university's Departments of Geosciences and Biology, the museum also hosts educational programs on fossil preparation and ongoing scientific research. The Ellis County Historical Society Museum, located downtown, maintains exhibits of artifacts from the area's Old West period through its settlement by Volga and Bukovina Germans. Included in the museum complex are the Volga German Haus, a reproduction of an early Volga German settler home, and a stone chapel constructed in 1879. Southwest of Hays, the Kansas Historical Society maintains the Fort Hays State Historic Site. It consists of four of the fort's original structures and a visitor's center. Other sites related to the area's frontier period include Boot Hill, the city's earliest cemetery, and a historical marker at the site of the ill-fated town of Rome.

To capitalize on the community's Old West heritage, the local chamber of commerce promotes downtown Hays as the historic Chestnut Street District. Local businesses offer dining, shopping, and entertainment, and visitors can tour designated historical sites in the district via a self-guided walking tour.

Religion

There are 27 Christian churches in Hays, the majority of which are Protestant. That number also includes four Catholic churches,  a Jehovah's Witnesses congregation, and a meetinghouse of the Church of Jesus Christ of Latter-day Saints. Hays is also home to a community of the Baháʼí Faith community. The Hays District of the United Methodist Church, which consists of 21 counties in northwestern Kansas, is headquartered in the city.

Sports
Fort Hays State University's athletic teams, known as the Fort Hays Tigers, compete in several sports in the NCAA Division II MIAA conference.

In addition to FHSU sports, Hays is home to an amateur baseball team and a rodeo company. The Hays Larks are a collegiate summer baseball team in the Jayhawk Collegiate League of the National Baseball Congress. The team dates back to 1869 when local residents founded it as The Hays Town Team. From June through August, the Mid–America Rodeo Company puts on rough stock rodeo performances on weeknights, including Saddle bronc and bareback riding, bull riding, and barrel racing, as well as professional horse racing events.

In popular culture and the arts
Hays has been a setting of multiple films. The Plainsman (1936) and Wild Bill (1995), both of which dramatize the life and career of Wild Bill Hickok, are partially set in Hays during the late 1860s and early 1870s. Paper Moon (1973) is partially set in Great Depression-era Hays, and a portion of the film was shot in the city.  Hays was also the subject of the song 'Hays, Kansas' by the band 49 Winchester.

Notable people 

Several Old West figures lived in Hays during its period as a frontier outpost, including Calamity Jane (1852-1903), Buffalo Bill Cody (1846-1917), General George Custer (1839-1876) and his wife Elizabeth (1842-1933), and gunfighters Wild Bill Hickok (1837-1876) and Clay Allison (1840-1887).

Other notable individuals who were born in and/or have lived in Hays include business magnate Philip Anschutz (1939- ), U.S. Senator Jerry Moran (1954- ), and feminist legal pioneer Frances Tilton Weaver (1904-2003).

Sister cities
Hays has two sister cities as designated by Sister Cities International:

Gallery

See also
 Great Flood of 1951

References

Further reading

External links

 City of Hays
 Hays - Directory of Public Officials
 Official Hays Convention and Visitors Bureau
 Summary of Hays history
 Historic Images of Hays, Special Photo Collections at Wichita State University Library
 Hays city map, KDOT

 
American frontier
Bukovina German diaspora
Cities in Kansas
County seats in Kansas
Micropolitan areas of Kansas
Populated places established in 1867
Cities in Ellis County, Kansas
Boot Hill cemeteries
Sundown towns in Kansas